The Montclarion may refer to:
the student newspaper of Montclair State University
a weekly newspaper published in Montclair, Oakland, California by the East Bay Times